

Lake Eyre is a locality in the Australian state of South Australia located about  north of the state capital of Adelaide and  north  of the town of Marree and which is associated with the occasional body of water known as Lake Eyre.

The locality was established on 26 April 2013 in respect to “the long established local name.”  Its name is derived from the former Lake Eyre National Park.

The locality covers the full extent of Lake Eyre including islands within the lake’s extent, the Hunt Peninsula at the southern coast of the northern part of the lake and land on the lake’s east side.

The principal land use within the locality is conservation with its full extent being occupied by the following protected areas - the Elliot Price Conservation Park and the Kati Thanda-Lake Eyre National Park.

Lake Eyre is located within the federal Division of Grey, the state electoral district of Stuart, the Pastoral Unincorporated Area of South Australia and the state’s Far North region.

See also
Murrili meteorite

References

Towns in South Australia
Far North (South Australia)
Lake Eyre basin
Places in the unincorporated areas of South Australia